Vändra Parish was an Estonian municipality located in Pärnu County. It had a population of 2,861 (as of 1 December 2012) and covered an area of 642 km².

On 27 October 2009 the neighbouring Kaisma Parish was merged with Vändra Parish.

Settlements
Villages
Aluste - Allikõnnu - Kaansoo - Kadjaste - Kaisma - Kalmaru - Kergu - Kirikumõisa - Kobra - Kõnnu - Kose - Kullimaa - Kurgja - Leetva - Luuri - Lüüste - Mädara - Massu - Metsavere - Metsaküla - Mustaru - Oriküla - Pärnjõe - Rae - Rahkama - Rahnoja - Rätsepa - Reinumurru - Rõusa - Säästla - Samliku - Sikana - Sohlu - Suurejõe - Tagassaare - Ünnaste - Vaki - Venekuusiku - Veskisoo - Vihtra - Viluvere - Võidula - Võiera

References

External links
 

Former municipalities of Estonia